Bonneville High School can refer to:

Bonneville High School (Idaho Falls, Idaho)
Bonneville High School (Washington Terrace, Utah)